Mustla may refer to several places in Estonia:

Mustla, small borough in Tarvastu Parish, Viljandi County
Mustla, Järva County, village in Paide Parish, Järva County
Mustla, Pärnu County, village in Saarde Parish, Pärnu County
Mustla, Laimjala Parish, village in Laimjala Parish, Saare County
Mustla, Pihtla Parish, village in Pihtla Parish, Saare County